"The Dragon King" is a BBC Books story adventure book written by Trevor Baxendale and based on the long-running British science fiction television series Doctor Who. It features the Tenth Doctor.

This is part of the Decide Your Destiny series which makes you choose what happens in the books.

Plot
Your journey takes you to the planet Elandeffn, where people live side by side with dragons. But hunters from a neighbouring planet are attacking... Can you restore peace to these two clashing worlds?

2008 British novels
2008 science fiction novels
Decide Your Destiny gamebooks
Tenth Doctor novels
Novels set on fictional planets